Pafos FC is a Cypriot football club based in Paphos. The club was created in 2014, by the merger of the two biggest teams of Paphos, AEP Paphos and AEK Kouklia. They play their home games at the Stelios Kyriakides Stadium, and currently compete in the Cypriot First Division.

History
Pafos FC formed by a merger between the strongest football forces of the Province of Paphos. The Pafos FC Association represents Paphian football and sports throughout Cyprus through the football team and the Football Academy, which has hosts hundreds of young athletes. The emblem of Pafos FC includes the name of the Club and Town in which the figure of the Eternal Adolescent Hero Evagoras Pallikarides is integrated. The shape and colours of the emblem (white, blue and gold) refer to the historical clubs of APOP and AEK Kouklia. The emblem was renewed during the period 2018-19, making the figure of the hero Evagoras Pallikarides more visible.

On 10 June 2014, in the historic building of the AEP Paphos FC, hosted the first gathering of the friends of the merged team, in the presence of politicians, active and veteran football players of Paphos and hundreds of fans. The first president of the team was Christakis Kaizer, who was the president of AEK Kouklia and one of the main people of the effort to create the new team together with the then six-member managing committee of AEP, consisting of pure friends of the Paphian team, who kept it alive until the end of the then season, along with the then coaches, young players and executives and players of the Academy, under adverse economic conditions.

As an official home stadium for its obligations in the championship of the first division, the team uses Stelios Kyriakides Stadium (Paphiako Stadium).

The purpose of the Club is to promote noble rivalry, "fair play" and culture both through sports activities and through numerous cultural and educational events, visits to schools and educational institutions in Paphos. For the past two years, the team has been projecting a picture of renewal and full professionalism in all departments and levels. An important event is the complete renovation of the training center to the standards of European clubs.

The team's first coach was Radmilo Ivančević, who served as AEP Paphos coach in the past. Pafos FC competed in the 2014–15 Cypriot Second Division, in their first season as a club.

The new team participated in the Division B championship 2014-15. The first match in Club's new history was against Enosis Neon Paralimni FC, at the Municipal Stadium of Geroskipou which was the first Home stadium of the team. At the end of the period the team achieved the second place and was promoted to the first division. In 2015-16 season, in the first participation of Pafos FC in the first division, the team finished in 12th place and was relegated. First victory and the team's first overall victory in the first division came on 12 September 2015 in the third game of the league when Pafos FC defeated Aris Limassol FC 3-0 at home.
In the 2016-17 season, the team finished 2nd in Cyprus Second Division Championship and was promoted to the First Division. The following season, Pafos FC remained in the top division, finishing in 10th place under the leadership of their new owner, Total Sports Investments, managed by British businessman Roman Dubov. Changes in the Club's structure, in the Academy's operational processes, renovation of the Pafos FC Training Center along with resounding transfers significantly raised the level of the Club which now appears to be one of the most modern and well-equipped teams in Cyprus.Pafos FC accomplished its greatest achievement to date on 25 February 2022, when a 1-1 home draw against Aris Limassol allowed Pafos FC to get ahead of Omonia in the fight for a top 6 finish, and secure a place in the championship play-offs, for the first time in the club's history. On this day, a new attendance record was set for Pafos FC, as over 4661 fans came to support the club.

Domestic history

Badge and colours
The logo of Pafos FC is a variation of AEP Paphos's logo and a refresh of Pafos FC first logo, including the name of the team and town and the classic figure of the hero Evagoras Pallikaridis. The logo also includes the team's colours, the blue, white and gold. The emblem was renewed during the period 2018-19, making the figure of the hero Evagoras Pallikarides more visible.

Shirt sponsors and manufacturers

Players

Other players under contract

Out on loan

Current staff

Managers

References

External links

Official website

 
Football clubs in Cyprus
Association football clubs established in 2014
2014 establishments in Cyprus
Paphos